Vira Ageyeva (born 1958) is a Ukrainian literary critic and philologist. In 1990, she and other scholars established the first feminist seminars in the country as an initiative of the National Academy of Sciences of Ukraine and she was a co-founder of the Kyiv Institute for Gender Studies in 1998. She was honored as a joint winner of the Shevchenko National Prize in 1996 and the Petro Mohyla Prize, an award given by Academic Council of the National University of Kyiv-Mohyla Academy, in 2008.

Early life and education
Vira Pavlovna Ageyeva was born 30 July 1958 in Bakhmach, Chernihiv Oblast, Ukrainian Soviet Socialist Republic. In 1980, she graduated from the Taras Shevchenko National University in Kyiv and began working as a senior researcher of the Institute of Literature there. From 1985, she was employed at the Institute of Literature of the National Academy of Sciences of Ukraine. In 1990, Ageyeva, Tamara Hundorova, and Natalka Shumylo worked with  Solomiia Pavlychko to establish a feminist seminar at the Institute of Literature of the National Academy. It was the first time the methodology of feminist analysis and gender criticism was introduced in the country. These same women established a feminist section in the academic journal Slovo i Chas (Word and Time) and began publishing works such as Ageyeva's Women's Space: Feminist Discourse of Ukrainian Modernism, hoping to establish feminist analysis within literary studies. Their work led to other academics establishing gender studies programs throughout the country. In 1995, Ageyeva earned her PhD in philology from the same institution.

Career
After completing her doctorate, Ageyeva started her career as the deputy editor-in-chief of the academic journal Slovo i Chas in 1995. The following year, she was appointed as a professor at the National University of Kyiv-Mohyla Academy. She was a co-founder of the Київського інституту ґендерних досліджен (Kyiv Center for Gender Studies), which was launched at the National Academy's Institute of Literature in 1998. Between 2006 and 2007, Ageyeva was the third Chopivsky Fellow of Ukrainian Studies at Stanford University near Palo Alto, California.

Research
Ageyeva's work focuses on the issues of gender identity and the complexity of gender relationships as they are portrayed in literature. Her literary criticism evaluates from a psychoanalytical perspective the characters and traditional values as they conflict with contemporary context. She is interested in the 20th-century styles of Ukrainian prose of the 20th century, and particularly the Ukrainian writers who were part of the Executed Renaissance. For example, in such articles as "A Voice of Her Own: Female Integrity and the Modernist Revolt", in Other Optics: Gender Challenges of Today, Ageyeva notes that women authors were often excluded from literary canons, forcing them to find their ways to express their authentic voices. Ukrainian women writers, thus turned away from 19th-century objective realism and introduced modernist trends of subjectivity. 

Eight of the authors, including Ageyeva, Donchyk, and  received the Shevchenko National Prize in 1996 for their work on the textbooks. Her work Поетика парадокса: інтелектуальна проза Віктора Петрова-Домонтовича (Poetics of Paradox: Intellectual Prose of Victor Petrov-Domontovich) won the 2008 Petro Mohyla Prize of the Academic Council of the National University of Kyiv-Mohyla Academy and her work on Maksym Rylsky, published in 2012, received a literary scholarship award from the magazine . In the book, she had argued that Rylsky had rejected Socialist realism, the official literary style, in favor of a neoclassical Ukrainian method.

Selected works

References

Citations

Bibliography

1958 births
Living people
People from Chernihiv Oblast
Taras Shevchenko National University of Kyiv alumni
Academic staff of the National University of Kyiv-Mohyla Academy
Gender studies academics
Ukrainian literary critics
Ukrainian philologists
Women literary critics
Women philologists
20th-century Ukrainian women writers
21st-century Ukrainian women writers
Ukrainian women academics